Chiap Saeng-Xuto (16 September 1902 – 28 November 1971), known by the noble title Luang Pradiyat Navayudh, was a Thai naval captain. He was the eldest son of Admiral Phraya Mahayotha (Chang Saeng-Xuto) and a nephew of Chaophraya Surasakmontri (Choem Saeng-Xuto). He attended the Royal Naval College, Greenwich and joined the Royal Thai Navy in 1927, serving until 1946 when he was transferred to a civilian post under the Ministry of Foreign Affairs. He was also a sports sailor, and competed in the Star event at the 1956 Summer Olympics.

References

Royal Thai Navy personnel
Thai male sailors (sport)
Olympic sailors of Thailand
Sailors at the 1956 Summer Olympics – Star
1902 births
1971 deaths